Terris were a Welsh indie band who had a minor UK hit single in 2001 with "Fabricated Lunacy".

History
Founded in Newport in 1998, they were fronted by Gavin Goodwin, supported by Alun Bound on guitar, Neil Dugmore on bass and keyboards, and Owen Matthews on drums.

The band released The Time Is Now, their first EP, in 1999 on Rough Trade.  This gained them prominent support from the New Musical Express magazine, which hailed them as a "21st Century Joy Division" and "the best new band in the UK", and featured them on its front cover in January 2000.  Also that year, the group co-headlined a tour with Coldplay, at some particularly small venues including the Tunbridge Wells Forum the week of Coldplay's first Top 40 success, and won the "brightest hope" at the 2000 NME Brats.

Journalist Ted Kessler wrote of the band, "Only one band want to make records that blow holes through the limits of what we currently meekly accept as sonically reasonable in the field of rock. Only one band can. And that’s Terris."

They subsequently signed to the Blanco y Negro label, releasing two further singles, the second of which, "Fabricated Lunacy", reached number 42 on the UK Singles Chart. Debut album Learning to Let Go was released in March 2001. Critical reaction was mixed, with Allmusic commenting on "Goodwin's grating, tune-seeking vocal grunts" and the band's "leg-splayed, Bush-styled grunge-metal hooks and glaringly obvious lyrical themes". Yahoo Music described it as "underflavoured, bland stodge". NMEs April Long was more positive, giving it an 8 out of 10 rating and calling it "a vociferous statement of intent from a band dedicated to annihilating clichés". Disappointing sales led to them being dropped in December of that year.  The band split up shortly afterwards.

Discography

Albums
Learning to Let Go (2001), Blanco y Negro

Singles, EPs
The Time is Now EP (1999), Rough Trade
"Cannibal Kids" (2000), Blanco y Negro
"Fabricated Lunacy" (2001), Blanco y Negro - UK #62

References

External links
Terris - a taste of the future!

Musical groups from Newport, Wales
Welsh indie rock groups